Below is a list of the rosters for the 2020 WNBL season.

Rosters

Adelaide Lightning

Bendigo Spirit

Canberra Capitals

Melbourne Boomers

Perth Lynx

Southside Flyers

Sydney Uni Flames

Townsville Fire

References

External links
 WNBL official website

rosters
Women's National Basketball League lists